Charles Augustus Ferguson (May 10, 1875 – May 17, 1931) was a relief pitcher and umpire in Major League Baseball in the early 20th century.

Ferguson played in one game for the Chicago Orphans of the National League in 1901. He pitched two innings, giving up one hit and two walks; he did not allow a run.

In 1913, Ferguson umpired 121 games in the American League, followed by a single game in 1914. In the 122 games he umpired, he made six ejections.

Ferguson died in May 1931, having drowned in Lake Superior's Whitefish Bay with two other men during a fishing trip.

See also
 List of Major League Baseball umpires

References

External links

1875 births
1931 deaths
Chicago Orphans players
Major League Baseball pitchers
Major League Baseball umpires
Baseball players from Michigan
Accidental deaths in Michigan
Deaths by drowning in the United States
Minor league baseball managers
Lansing Senators players
Toledo Mud Hens players
Tacoma Rabbits players
Tacoma Colts players
Sioux City Cornhuskers players
Minneapolis Millers (baseball) players
St. Paul Saints (AA) players
Wausau Lumberjacks players
Appleton Papermakers players